Batticaloa Municipal Council (BMC) is the local authority for the city of Batticaloa in eastern Sri Lanka. BMC is responsible for providing a variety of local public services including roads, sanitation, drains, housing, libraries, public parks and recreational facilities. It has 19 members elected using the open list proportional representation system. The territory of BMC is commensurate with that of Manmunai North Divisional Secretariat.

History
Batticaloa was administered by a local board between 1884 and 1932. The city was promoted to an Urban Council with eight wards in 1933. The number of wards was increased to 10 in 1944. In 1956 the territory of the council was increased as well as the number of wards to 14. The council was merged with Manmunai North – East (Northern Portion) Village Council in 1967 and promoted to a Municipal Council. BMC had 19 wards. The first mayor of BMC was Chelliah Rajadurai, the local Member of Parliament.

The council was dissolved in 1974 and administered by special commissioners until 1983 when local elections were held. All members of the council resigned shortly after the election. Batticaloa was once again administered by special commissioners, this time until 1994 when local elections were held. In 1988 BMC absorbed Valaieravu Rural Council. The council was dissolved on 31 March 1999. Special commissioners administered the city until 2008 when elections were held.

Mayors

The Mayor of Batticaloa is the head of Batticaloa Municipal Council.

Commissioners, Deputy Commissioners and secretaries
The following were some of the city's commissioners and secretaries:

Secretaries
 1937–63 K. Thirunavukarasu
 1966–67 J. J. C. Tambinayagam

Commissioners
 1967–1970 J. J. C. Tambinayagam
 1988–1989 M. Sinniah (Acting)
 1989–1991 K. Karthigesu (Acting)
 1992–1994 C. Punniyamoorthy
 1994–1996 P. Kanapathipillai
 1996–2006 S. Navaneethan
 2006–2009 M. Uthayakumar
 2009–2013 K. Sivanathan
 2014–2016 M.Uthayakumar
 2017–2018 V.Thavarajah
 2018–2018 N.Manivannan
 2018-2020 K.Sithiravel
 2020-     M.Thayaparan

Deputy Commissioners
 2013 – N.Thananjayan
2019- U.Sivarajah

Municipal Secretaries
 2017 – Rifka Shafeen
 2018 – Siyahul hug

1983 local government election
Results of the local government election held on 18 May 1983:

All members of the council resigned one month after being sworn in. Batticaloa didn't have an elected local government for sporadic periods, this was due to various reasons. Aljazeera, the Asiafoundation and the Daily Mirror attribute this to civil war; Reuters and the US State Department attribute this to calls for election boycotts by the LTTE (enforced with brutal reprisals for non-compliance) and the Tamilnet attribute it to The Sri Lankan government's suspension of all local government in the north and east of the country in 1983 using Emergency Regulations. Batticaloa was administered by special commissioners until 1994 when local elections were held. The council was dissolved on 31 March 1999. Special commissioners administered the city until the 2008 elections.

2008 local government election
Results of the local government election held on 10 March 2008:

The following candidates were elected:
Sivageetha "Pathmini" Prabhakaran (UPFA-TMVP), 4,722 preference votes (pv); Sellappillai "Chelliah" Aseerwatham (Ind 1), 949 pv; Kandiah Arumailingam (Ind 1-EPDP); Edwin Silva Krishnanandaraja alias Piratheep Master (UPFA-TMVP), 3,805 pv; John Baptist Fernando (UPFA); Abiragam George Pillai (UPFA); Namasivayam Karunanantham (UPFA); Thambiaiah Kirubarajah (UPFA); Maylvakanam Niskanandararajah (Ind 1); Rajanathan Prabhakaran (EROS); Wellington Rajendra Prasad (UPFA); Kanagasabai Preman (UPFA); Nagoor Khan Ramlan (SLMC); Pragasam Sagayamany alias Killi Master (UPFA-TMVP); Devanayagam Weerasingam Sathyananthan (UPFA); Mahendiramoorthy Suthenthiran (Ind 1); Kandasamy Thavarasa (UPFA); Benadit Thanabalasingam (Ind 1); and R. Thurairatnam (Ind 1-EPRLF).

Sivageetha Prabhakaran (UPFA-TMVP) and Edwin Silva Krishnanandaraja (UPFA-TMVP) were appointed Mayor and Deputy Mayor respectively.

Edwin Silva Krishnanandaraja of UPFA-TMVP resigned as a member of BMC and was replaced by Selvarasa Sasikumar. He was replaced as Deputy Mayor by Abiragam George Pillai (UPFA).

R. Thurairatnam (Ind 1-EPRLF) resigned to contest the Eastern provincial council elections. He was replaced by Kandasamy Mahenthiraraja (Ind 1).

References

Municipal Council
Local authorities in Eastern Province, Sri Lanka
Municipal councils of Sri Lanka